The sixth Annual Pop Corn Music Awards in 1996, at the Aliki Theatre, in Athens, Greece. The awards recognized the most popular artists and albums in Greece from the year 1996 as voted by readers of Greek music publication Pop Corn. The ceremony was hosted by Petros Filipidis and Natalia Germanou in March, 1997. The Pop Corn Music Awards were discontinued in 2002.

Performances

Winners and nominees

References 

1996
1996 music awards